Dysgonia multilineata is a moth of the family Noctuidae first described by William Jacob Holland in 1894. It is found in Africa, including Sierra Leone.

References

Dysgonia
Moths of Africa
Fauna of Gabon